Molina is a Spanish occupational surname. Molina is Latin for 'mill' and is derived from another Latin word, mola ('millstone'). The surname originated from the early Middle Ages, referring to a person who operates a mill or a millstone. Other Spanish surnames, like Molinero (literally: 'miller'), have also originated in the work and management of a mill. Spanish municipalities like Molina de Segura (Murcia) or Molina de Aragón (Castilla-La Mancha) still nowadays include millstones or mill blades in their respective coats of arms (cf. coat of arms of Molina de Segura and Coats of arms of Molina de Aragón).

A bloodline of Molinas, in the Christian Kingdom of Castile, originated from ennoblement when Manrique Pérez de Lara, of the House of Lara, in April 1154 issued a fuero to the town of Molina, nowadays called Molina de Aragón.

A
Alfonso Quiñónez Molina (1874–1950), President of El Salvador twice 1918–1927
Alfred Molina (born 1953), English actor
Alvaro de Molina (born 1957), American banker, chief financial officer of Bank of America Corporation
Ángela Molina (born 1955), Spanish actress
Antonio Muñoz Molina (born 1956), Spanish writer and member of the Royal Spanish Academy
Antonio Sebastián de Toledo Molina y Salazar (1625–1710), viceroy of New Spain 1664–1673
Antonio Tejero Molina (born 1932), a Spanish Lieutenant-Colonel who attempted a coup d'état
Arturo Armando Molina (1927–2021), President of El Salvador 1972–1977

B
Bengie Molina (born 1974), Puerto Rican baseball player

C
Carmen Molina, Mexican actress
Clarissa Molina (born 1991), Miss Dominican Republic and Top 10 Miss Universe 2015

D
Dafne Molina (born 1982), Mexican beauty pageant titleholder
Delfina Molina y Vedia (1879–1961), Argentine chemist, writer, teacher, painter, and singer

E
Edward C. Molina (1877–1964), American teletraffic engineer
Enrique Molina (actor) (1943–2021), Cuban actor
Enrique Molina Sobrino (contemporary), wealthy Mexican businessman, sued for fraud by the Mexican government
Enrique Molina (athlete) (born 1968), Spanish middle-distance runner

F
Florencio Molina Campos (1891–1959), Argentine painter
Franklin Molina (born 1984), Venezuelan road cyclist
Fray Alonzo de Molina (1513 or 1514 – 1579 or 1585), author of a classic Nahuatl-Spanish Vocabulario

G
Gerardo Molina (1906–1991), Colombian writer, politician, and academic
Gloria Molina (born 1948), American politician, chairwoman of the Los Angeles County Board of Supervisors
Gustavo Molina (born 1982), Venezuelan baseball player

H
Hector Garcia-Molina (contemporary), American engineering professor, member of the Board of Directors of Oracle Corporation
Hilda Molina (born 1942), Cuban neurosurgeon and dissident
Hugo Antonio Laviada Molina, a Mexican politician

I
Infanta Maria Francisca, Countess of Molina (1800–1834), Portuguese infanta daughter of King John VI of Portugal
Infante Carlos, Count of Molina (1788–1855), son of King Charles IV of Spain, Carlist pretender to the throne of Spain
Ivan Molina (born 1946), Colombian tennis player
Agent Isabella Molina, an undercover cop in "Rush Hour 2"

J
Jacinto Molina (Paul Naschy) (1934–2009), Spanish movie actor, screenwriter, and director
Jason Molina (1974–2013), American indie rock musician
Jennifer Molina (born 1981), Mexican female footballer
John John Molina (Juan Molina) (born 1965), Puerto Rican boxer
John Molina, Jr. (born 1982), American boxer
Jorge Molina (born 1966), Cuban film director
José Angel Molina (born 1958), Puerto Rican boxer
José Antonio Molina Rosito (1926–2012), Honduran botanist (Ant.Molina)
José Molina (born 1975), Puerto Rican baseball player
José Domingo Molina Gómez (1896–1969), interim President of Argentina 1955
José Francisco Molina (born 1970), Spanish football player
Juan Francisco de Molina (1779–1878), First President of Independent Honduras
Juan Ignacio Molina (1740–1829), Chilean priest and naturalist
Juan Manuel Molina (born 1979), Spanish race walker
Juana Molina (born 1962), Argentine singer, songwriter, and actress
Justo Páez Molina (1902–1969), Argentine politician, Governor of Córdoba 1963–1966
Jacinto Tigno Molina (1894-1944) Filipino Politician, Mayor of Bulakan, Bulacan 1935-1938, Governor of Bulacan, Philippines 1938-1940
João Antonio Molina Cagnoni (1949-2005) Brazilian Journalist

K
Kim Molina (born 1991), Filipino actress
Keann Molina (born 2006), Filipino Artist Portrait Artist, Artist

L
Laura Molina (badminton) (contemporary), Spanish badminton player
Laura Molina (born 1957), American artist
Lauren Molina, American actress, singer, songwriter
 Luis de Molina (1535–1600), Spanish Jesuit priest and theologian
 Luis Molina (boxer) (1938–2013), American boxer
 Luis Molina (rugby player) (born 1959), Argentine rugby union player
 Luis Manuel Molina (born 1959), Cuban musician, composer and broadcaster
 Luis Molina (baseball) (born 1974), Nicaraguan baseball coach
 Luis Pedro Molina (born 1977), Guatemalan football goalkeeper
 Luis Molina (athlete) (born 1988), Argentine athlete

M
Manuel Luis Quezon y Molina (1877–1944), first or second president of the Philippines
Mariana Molina (born 1990), Brazilian actress
Mario J. Molina (1943–2020), Mexican Nobel Prize recipient in chemistry
Marquis de Molina (fl. 1821–1867), Spanish politician and government minister
Mauricio Molina (golfer) (born 1966), Argentine golfer
Mauricio Molina (born 1980), Colombian football player

N
Nahuel Molina (born 1997), Argentine football player

O
 Olivia Molina (singer) (born 1946), German-Mexican singer
 Olivia Molina (actress) (born 1980), Spanish actress

P
 Pedro X. Molina (born 1976), Nicaraguan caricaturist
Pilar Molina Llorente (born 1943), Spanish writer

R
Rafael Leónidas Trujillo Molina (1891–1961), dictator of the Dominican Republic 1930–1961
Rafael Molina Sánchez (1841–1900), Spanish matador
Ralph Molina (born 1943), American rock drummer
Raúl De Molina (born 1959), Cuban television celebrity on Univision
Remigio Molina (born 1970), Argentine Olympic boxer
Romain Molina (born 1991), French investigative reporter
Rolando Molina (born 1971), El Salvadoran-American actor

S
Scott Molina (born 1960), American championship triathlete

T
Tirso de Molina (1571–1648), Spanish dramatist and poet

Y
Yadier Molina (born 1982), Puerto Rican baseball player

See also
Marquis of Molina
Molinas

References 

Spanish-language surnames